Garry Judd (born 6 March 1962) is a British contemporary classical composer. He is also known for his television music (Trinny & Susannah Undress, All About Me, and  Babyfather), but he also writes commercially released music which has been played and broadcast around the world by performers such as The Royal Philharmonic Orchestra, Courtney Pine, Leslie Howard (musician), John Etheridge, Christopher Warren-Green, Guy Pratt and The London Community Gospel Choir.

He currently plays Warwick (bass guitar) basses and PRS Guitars and uses Tannoy monitors. He is a member of British Academy of Film and Television Arts, The MCPS, The Performing Right Society and The British Academy of Songwriters, Composers and Authors.

Discography
 Field Sketches for orchestra (Compendium Recordings) (2016)
 On Vacation - Re-recorded and remastered (Chillville Records) (2016)
 On The Orient Express - Compilation (Chillville Records) (2016)
 Sands of Meditation - Compilation (Chillville Records) (2016)
 The Green Man (orchestral suite) (Compendium Recordings) (2016)
 The Age Of Steam - Remastered (Chillville Records) (2014)
 The Book Of Knowledge - Remastered (Chillville Records) (2014)
 The Essence - I Am Forecasting Sun EP (Chillville Records) (2013)
 The Essence - Summer Haze EP (Chillville Records) (2007)
 The Essence (Chillville Records) (2005)
 Ambience (Water Music Records) (2001)
 Gaia (Chillville Records) (2000)

External links
 Official website

English television composers
English male composers
Musicians from London
Living people
1962 births